This is a list of telephone companies in Canada.

Canadian telephone companies
Note: incumbent local exchange carriers are indicated with an asterisk (*).

 AstraQom
 BabyTEL
 Bell Canada & * BCE Inc.* - including Bell Aliant* (which itself integrated Manitoba Telecom Services; NorthernTel; Ontera; and MT&T, NewTel, NBTel, and IslandTel), Northwestel,* and Télébec*
 Birch Communications
 Brooke Telecom Co-operative Ltd
 Bruce Telecom
 CityWest
 Cogeco
 Comwave
 Distributel
 DMTS
 Eastlink
 Execulink Telecom
 Fido
 Freedom Mobile
 Gosfield North Communications Co-op
 Iristel, including its Ice Wireless affiliate
 LES.NET
 Lucky Mobile
 MNSi Telecom
 North Renfrew Telephone Company
 Novus
 Provincial Tel
 Public Mobile
 Rogers Communications, including the Chatr brand
 SaskTel
 Shaw Communications
 Signal Canada
 Sogetel
 Tbaytel
 TekSavvy Solutions Inc.
 TELUS - made up of BCTel, AGT Vidéotron'''

See also

 Canadian Independent Telephone Association
 List of Canadian mobile phone companies
 List of Canadian electric utilities
 List of public utilities
 List of United States telephone companies
 List of telephone operating companies

References

Canada Telephone companies, list of Canadian
 
Telephone companies
Canadian telephone